Conus suturatus, common name the violet-base cone, is a species of sea snail, a marine gastropod mollusk in the family Conidae, the cone snails and their allies.

Like all species within the genus Conus, these snails are predatory and venomous. They are capable of "stinging" humans, therefore live ones should be handled carefully or not at all.

Subspecies
 Conus suturatus kashiwajimensis Shikama, 1971: synonym of Conus suturatus Reeve, 1844
 Conus suturatus sandwichensis Walls, 1978: synonym of Conus sandwichensis Walls, 1978

Description
The size of the shell varies between 25 mm and 43 mm. The color of the shell is yellowish or pink-white, with broad light brown bands. The spire and the base of the shell are sulcate.

Distribution
This marine species occurs in the Eastern Indian Ocean, in the Western Pacific Ocean and off Australia (Northern Territory, Queensland and Western Australia).

References
Notes

Sources
 Reeve, L.A. 1843. Descriptions of new species of shells figured in the 'Conchologia Iconica'. Proceedings of the Zoological Society of London 11: 169–197
 Sowerby, G.B. 1857–1858. Monograph of the genus Conus. 1–56, pls 1-24 in Thesaurus conchyliorum or monographs of genera of shells. London : Sowerby Vol. 3. 
 Gillett, K. & McNeill, F. 1959. The Great Barrier Reef and Adjacent Isles: a comprehensive survey for visitor, naturalist and photographer. Sydney : Coral Press 209 pp.
 Cernohorsky, W.O. 1978. Tropical Pacific Marine Shells. Sydney : Pacific Publications 352 pp., 68 pls.
 Kay, E.A. 1979. Hawaiian Marine Shells. Reef and shore fauna of Hawaii. Section 4 : Mollusca. Honolulu, Hawaii : Bishop Museum Press Bernice P. Bishop Museum Special Publication Vol. 64(4) 653 pp.
 Röckel, D., Korn, W. & Kohn, A.J. 1995. Manual of the Living Conidae. Volume 1: Indo-Pacific Region. Wiesbaden : Hemmen 517 pp.
 Petit, R. E. (2009). George Brettingham Sowerby, I, II & III: their conchological publications and molluscan taxa. Zootaxa. 2189: 1–218
 Puillandre N., Duda T.F., Meyer C., Olivera B.M. & Bouchet P. (2015). One, four or 100 genera? A new classification of the cone snails. Journal of Molluscan Studies. 81: 1–23

External links
 The Conus Biodiversity website
 Cone Shells – Knights of the Sea
 

suturatus
Gastropods described in 1844